Count Karl Karlovich Lambert (1815 – 20 July 1865) was a Russian General of Cavalry and  Namestnik of the Kingdom of Poland from August to October 1861.

From 1840 to 1844, he fought against Chechen highlanders during the Caucasian War. In 1848, he became chief of staff of II Russian Corps suppressing the Hungarian Revolution of 1848.

On 14 October 1861, he instituted martial law in the territory of Congress Poland.

References
 Ламберт граф Карл Карлович

1815 births
1865 deaths
Hungarian Revolution of 1848
Imperial Russian Army generals
Members of the State Council (Russian Empire)
Namestniks of the Kingdom of Poland
People of the Revolutions of 1848
Recipients of the Order of the White Eagle (Russia)